Let Them Know: The Story of Youth Brigade and BYO Records is a box set put together by BYO Records in honor of their 25th anniversary. It consists of a book documenting the history of the label as well as a DVD with a documentary and a CD consisting of 31 different artists covering songs that have appeared on BYO releases.

Track listing

References 

Punk rock compilation albums
2009 compilation albums
BYO Records compilation albums